Dhammakāya is a Pāli term which means "body of dharma", "body of truth" or the "body of enlightenment". Its Sanskrit equivalent is Dharmakāya. It can refer to:

 Dhammakāya, in Theravāda Buddhism, a figurative term meaning the sum of the Buddha's teachings
 Dhammakaya Tradition, Thai Buddhist tradition, mostly known through Wat Phra Dhammakaya
 Dhammakaya Tradition UK, specific lineage of Thai Buddhism in Britain
 Dhammakaya meditation, a Buddhist meditation technique
 Dhammakaya Media Channel, former name of Global Buddhist Network, Buddhist television channel owned by Wat Phra Dhammakaya

th:ธรรมกาย